The National Committee on United States China Relations (NCUSCR) is a nonprofit organization and advisory body founded in 1966 to encourage understanding and cooperation between the United States and China. Since 1966, the committee has conducted  exchanges, educational and policy activities in areas of politics and security, education, governance and civil society, economic cooperation, media and transnational issues, addressing these topics with respect to Mainland China, Hong Kong and Taiwan.

The committee's membership consists of American citizens, corporations and professional firms representing many viewpoints, but share the belief that productive U.S.-China relations require ongoing public education, face-to-face contact and exchange of ideas.

History

Origins of the National Committee 
The National Committee on United States–China Relations was founded in 1966 by a coalition of academic "China watchers," civic, religious, and business leaders who were concerned with China's isolation and American apparent interest in maintaining that situation. A key figure in recruiting and organizing them was Cecil Thomas, a Secretary of the American Friends Service Committee. Thomas became its first executive director.  The founders included figures in the China field such as Robert A. Scalapino, A. Doak Barnett, Alexander Eckstein, Lucian Pye. Their aim was to build a network from a broad political spectrum, committed to fostering open discussion and to improving U.S. policy toward China.

The committee was energized by helping to organize two groundbreaking conferences: the “Institute on China Today” held at University of California-Berkeley in 1964, and the “National Conference on the United States and China” in Washington, D.C. in 1965. Together, they gave a platform to debate the reshaping of the approach towards China. There was heated disagreement among even the scholars, but figures such as Henry Luce and American businessmen argued against defenders of the policy. There was widespread interest from newspapers, television, and the general public.  

Several presidents had wanted to move closer to normalization of relations with China but faced resistance in Congress. The committee's mission was to educate the public, but it soon found itself in the position to offer information and advice to President Lyndon B. Johnson and other political leaders. In 1972, it co-hosted the Chinese table tennis team's tour of the United States, a widely publicized event that captured world attention. The historic two-way exchange by American and Chinese table tennis teams became known as Ping Pong Diplomacy.

1970s to the 1990s 
During the years leading up to the 1979 normalization of relations, the National Committee encouraged thoughtful discussion about China policy among Americans and encouraged direct dialogue between American and Chinese people. The National Committee became the principal organization conducting public policy and other exchanges between China and the United States during the years leading up to the Reform and Opening and the establishment of diplomatic relations in 1979.

The Committee originally had intended to be only a  "catalyst" in opening relations with China, a short-term temporary goal. But a change in this attitude came when it was called upon to manage the visit of the Chinese table-tennis team, part of American ping-pong diplomacy. Because there were no official diplomatic relations between the two countries, the State Department had to rely on private resources. The Committee stepped in, raised money, and made arrangements. This experience changed the committee's relations with American and Chinese officials, as well as its own goals. In the 1980s, the Committee expanded its work to promote sustained interactions between influential Chinese and Americans in governance, media, urban planning, international relations, and economic management.

During the 1990s, the Committee expanded into rule of law, legislative affairs and the expansion of civil society in China. Programs included mayoral and municipal leader exchanges, judicial training and exchanges of senior jurists (including U.S. Supreme Court Justice Anthony M. Kennedy), and exchanges and programs on banking and economic policy, journalism, NGO and foundation development, human rights, and public health.

Since 2000 

In the 2000s, the National Committee expanded its range with new public education programs, study tours to introduce Chinese consular officers to American society, and in-depth briefings and trips to China for senior U.S. military officers. The National Committee also developed a 2005 program on community planning for HIV/AIDS prevention and treatment; a groundbreaking  visit to the United States by the chairman of the China Foundation for Human Rights Development; a program to help the reform of labor law in China; and a 2009 Land Use and Public Participation Program that addressed rights and ownership issues, among other initiatives.

Board of directors

Chair Carla A. Hills

Vice Chairs

Treasurer 

 Keith W. Abell

Secretary 

 I. Peter Wolff

Members 
 Jeffrey Bader
 Ajay Banga
 Dennis C. Blair
 Olivier Brandicourt
 Deborah Brautigam
 Milton Brice
 Kurt M. Campbell
 Amy Celico
 John S. Chen
 Daniel Cruise
 Nelson G. Dong
 Richard Edelman
 Martin S. Feldstein
 William E. Ford
 Barbara H. Franklin
 M. Taylor Fravel
 Charles W. Freeman III
 Richard Gelfond
 Jimmy Hexter
 Jon M. Huntsman, Jr.
 Muhtar Kent
 Elizabeth Knup
 David M. Lampton
 Terrill E. Lautz
 Cheng Li
 Kenneth Lieberthal
 Andrew N. Liveris
 Gary Locke
 Samuel J. Locklear III
 Evan S. Medeiros
 Kenneth P. Miller
 Howard P. Milstein
 Douglas H. Paal
 Sheldon Pang
 A. Robert Pietrzak
 Clark T. Randt, Jr.
 Anthony J. Saich
 Maggie Sans
 Rob Speyer
 James B. Steinberg
 Ernie L. Thrasher
 Jan F. van Eck
 Robert H. Xiao
 John Young

Former Chairs 

 A. Doak Barnett
 W. Michael Blumenthal
 Barber B. Conable, Jr.
 Alexander Eckstein
 Lucian W. Pye
 Robert A. Scalapino
 Raymond P. Shafer
 Charles W. Yost

Notes

Illustrative publications 

 Michel Oksenberg, Academy of Political Science (U.S.) and National Committee on United States–China Relations. China's Developmental Experience. (New York: Academy of Political Science, Proceedings of the Academy of Political Science 31.1,  1973).   
 
 Scalapino, R. A. (1967). An annotated guide to modern China. New York: National Committee on United States–China Relations.

References and further reading

External links

Institutions founded by the Rockefeller family
Rockefeller Foundation
Council on Foreign Relations
Non-profit organizations based in New York City
Organizations established in 1966
China–United States relations
1966 establishments in New York (state)